The Head of Kalmykia is an elected official who serves as the head of state of Kalmykia. Since the fall of the Soviet Union, three people have served as Heads of the Republic.

Chairmen of the Supreme Soviet

President

Head of the Republic

The latest election for the office was held on 14 September 2014

References 
 Russian Administrative divisions

 
Politics of Kalmykia
Kalmykia